Marguerite Nakhla  was a modern Egyptian painter (1908–1977), born on December 10, 1908 in Alexandria, Egypt.

Early life and education 
Because of her gender, Nakhla was not allowed to attend the newly established Egyptian School of Fine Arts. Instead she attended an all-girls school, taught in French and operated by nuns. After completing her primary education, Nakhla attended Pedagogic Arts Institute for Women Teachers before deciding to study art at the at the École nationale des Beaux-Arts in Paris, France. She graduated from the Paris art school in 1939 and returned to Egypt, where she taught and exhibited her own art for the next nine years.

Career 
In 1948, Nakhla returned to Paris to continue her studies at the École du Louvre. She would remain in Paris for another three years while she studied graphic arts, fresco painting, and continued to exhibit her work. Nakhla's work was even aquired by the Egyptian Embassy in Paris.

Nakhla continued to travel between Paris and Alexandria for several years before settling in Alexandria. She stopped exhibiting her work in 1975, just two years before her death in 1977.

She received her teaching Diploma in 1939, then studied muralism at the École du Louvre in 1951. She taught at the Institute of Fine Arts for Girls, Egypt. She lived in Alexandria, Paris, Cairo and Port Said.

Exhibitions

Special exhibitions 
 The first special exhibition in the French city of Anneber 1936
 Exhibition of the work of the Egyptian Embassy in Paris 1948
 Show Bernham Gallery  1954
 An exhibition of her work in Cairo - Alexandria - Port Said
 Comprehensive exhibition of work, 1965

Local exhibitions 
 Agro-industrial exhibition 1931
 Exhibition of art lovers in Alexandria 1932
 Exhibitions Autumn Salon - Salon Ordinations
 Cairo International Market 1958
 Society of Fine Arts, exhibition of her work  1978
 Egyptian Woman Creations 1999 (a special exhibition of her work)
 Exhibition for the Alexandrian art pioneers, Heliopolis 2007
 Egyptian Modern Art Museum Exhibition in January 2008

International exhibitions 
 Paris International Exhibition 1937
 Egypt-France Exhibition Museum Decorative Arts in Paris 1949
 International Fair Deauville,  France, 1960
 Three competitions for students of the High School of Fine Arts-year 36 / 37 / 1939, France

Awards and recognition

Missions and grants 
1965 full-time grant of artistic production for a year

International awards 
 First prize in three competitions in France for students of School 1936 - 1938
 Medal of the Paris International Exhibition 1937
 A certificate of excellence for the international painting exhibition Deauville, France

See also
 Coptic art
 Coptic Orthodox Church of Alexandria
 Icon
 List of prominent Copts

References

Further reading 
 

1908 births
1977 deaths
Egyptian academics
Egyptian Copts
Egyptian women painters
20th-century Egyptian painters
20th-century Egyptian women artists